The 1993 Dallas Cowboys season was the franchise's 34th season in the National Football League (NFL) and was the fifth and final year of the franchise under head coach Jimmy Johnson. During Johnson's tenure, the Cowboys made two of their three Super Bowl appearances between 1992 and 1995 and won back-to-back Super Bowl titles. The season is notable for seeing the Cowboys become the first team to start 0–2 and still reach (and subsequently win) the Super Bowl. The following off-season was marked by the surprising resignation of Johnson, who departed the Cowboys due to a dispute with owner Jerry Jones about who deserved more credit for the back-to-back Super Bowl wins. This would be Johnson's last head coaching job until 1996, when he became the new head coach of the Miami Dolphins to replace the retiring Don Shula, who served as their head coach since 1970.

The 1993 Cowboys ranked #23 on the 100 greatest teams of all time presented by the NFL on its 100th anniversary.

Preseason

Season summary
The Cowboys' journey towards Super Bowl XXVIII proved more difficult than the previous season. Running back Emmitt Smith held out the first two regular season games over a contract dispute.  Dallas would lose both games to the Washington Redskins and Buffalo Bills starting the season at 0–2.  The team would also acquire veteran quarterback Bernie Kosar after his release from the Cleveland Browns as insurance for starting quarterback Troy Aikman, who suffered a severe concussion in the NFC Championship game versus San Francisco, and backup Steve Beuerlein signed with the Phoenix Cardinals.

In arguably his finest game as a professional, Emmitt Smith suffered a 2nd degree separated shoulder in the regular season finale versus their NFC East division rival, New York Giants.  Smith willed himself through excruciating pain and carried the Cowboys to an overtime win.  Dallas finished with an NFC-best 12–4 record and home field advantage throughout the playoffs.  Smith was later named the NFL MVP and with 1,486 rushing yards and 9 touchdowns, also gave him his third NFL rushing title.  Smith would also later be voted Super Bowl MVP, giving him the honor of being the only player to win all three awards in the same season.   Another outstanding Smith performance came against the Eagles, where he rushed for a career-high 237 yards.

The season was also notable for the Leon Lett "blunder" in the annual Thanksgiving Day game.  With Texas Stadium unusually covered with snow and ice, Dallas led the Dolphins 14–13 with seconds remaining as the Dolphins' Pete Stoyanovich attempted a long field goal.  The Cowboys' Jimmie Jones blocked the field goal, apparently ending the game.   However, with the blocked ball rolling around at the Dallas 10, Lett attempted to fall on it and slipped, kicking the ball and making it "live" again.  Miami's Jeff Dellenbach recovered and Stoyanovich made the most of his shorter second chance, giving the Dolphins a most improbable 16–14 win.

Aikman finished the regular season completing 271 out of 392 passes for 3,100 yards, 15 touchdowns, and 6 interceptions.  Wide receiver Michael Irvin once again led the team with 88 catches for 1,330 yards and 7 touchdowns. Wide receiver Alvin Harper had 36 catches for 777 yards and 5 touchdowns, and tight end Jay Novacek had 44 receptions for 445 yards and 1 touchdown.  The offensive line consisted of Pro Bowlers Mark Stepnoski, Erik Williams, and Nate Newton. The defense was anchored by Pro Bowlers such as Russell Maryland, Ken Norton Jr., and Thomas Everett.

Regular season

Game summaries

Week 1 at Washington Redskins
Despite two touchdown catches by Alvin Harper the Cowboys, playing without Emmitt Smith, fell 35–16 at RFK Stadium.  Derrick Lassic, replacing Smith for the time being, rushed for 75 yards but the Cowboys offensive line, whose loyalty was to Smith, didn’t block for him with the same effort; safety James Washington called it “totally unfair to Lassic.”

Week 2 vs. Buffalo Bills
Before a home crowd frustrated by the Cowboys’ slow start and the continuing contract holdout by Emmitt Smith, the Cowboys fell behind the Bills 10–0, clawed back to tie the game, then fell on Steve Christie’s 35-yard field goal. Lin Elliott missed two kicks (and was cut from the team), Troy Aikman was intercepted twice, and Derrick Lassic fumbled twice.  An enraged (and deranged) Charles Haley threw his helmet at team owner Jerry Jones following the game.

Week 3 at Phoenix Cardinals
Three days before the game the Cowboys finally negotiated a four-year deal with Emmitt Smith.  In Smith’s first game back Derrick Lassic scored twice but his 60 total yards came on fourteen carries where Smith coming in cold had 45 yards on eight carries.  Dallas outgained the Cardinals in yards 410–273 and won 17–10.

First Bye week
For the first time in NFL history teams were allowed two Bye weeks.

Week 5 vs. Green Bay Packers
The Cowboys’ new kicker Eddie Murray booted five field goals as the Packers were crushed 36–14. Emmitt Smith had his first rushing score of the season.

Week 6 at Indianapolis Colts
While a Louisiana high school quarterback was winning multiple high school player of the year awards that year the present day quarterbacks of the Colts (Jack Trudeau and ex-Packer Don Majkowski) were being intercepted four times by the Cowboys in a 27–3 runaway.  Emmitt Smith burst past 100 yards with a score.

Week 7 vs. San Francisco 49ers

    
    
    
    
    
    
    
    
    

Michael Irvin 12 Rec, 168 Yds, 1TD

Week 8 second Bye week

Halloween at Philadelphia Eagles
Emmitt Smith exploded to 237 yards as the Cowboys broke out of a close score in the fourth quarter to win 23–10.  Troy Aikman and former Jet Ken O’Brien for the Eagles combined for just 203 yards and 23 incompletions.

Week 10 vs. New York Giants
With both teams at 5–2 the battle for the NFC East was joined at Texas Stadium and this game became another Cowboys runaway as Troy Aikman had two touchdowns and Emmitt Smith added two more.  In falling 31–9 Phil Simms and Kent Graham were sacked a combined five times.  

The win proved costly as Aikman suffered a leg injury in the fourth quarter and would miss the next two games.  

During halftime the Cowboys inducted Tom Landry into their Ring Of Honor.

Week 11 vs. Phoenix Cardinals
Jimmy Johnson decided to start rookie Jason Garrett but after Garrett proved ineffective with just two completions Johnson benched him for recently signed ex-Brown Bernie Kosar, who completed thirteen passes for 199 yards and a touchdown, this despite an end zone intentional grounding penalty that made the final score 20–15 Cowboys.

Week 12 at Atlanta Falcons
Despite two touchdowns Kosar could not get a victory as the struggling Falcons triumphed 27–14.  Emmitt Smith gained just one yard as the Cowboys were limited to 230 yards of offense to 400 for the Falcons.

Week 13 Thanksgiving vs. Miami Dolphins 
Troy Aikman returned as the opening atop Texas Stadium allowed slushy snow onto the field. The Cowboys clawed to a 14–13 lead. In the final seconds a Pete Stoyanovich field goal was blocked. The kick landed beyond the line of scrimmage, and once the ball stopped moving the play would be declared dead and Dallas would gain possession. However, the ball landed and began spinning on its tip, leading Cowboys lineman Leon Lett to try to gain possession. Lett slipped, fell, and knocked the ball forward. He had been pressed into service on the Cowboys field goal block team despite having never played on special teams before. When it squirted off his foot, it became a live ball and the Dolphins recovered.  Stoyanovich booted the ensuing field goal and the Dolphins had the 16–14 win.

While some teammates were angered at Lett’s gaffe, Jimmy Johnson blamed himself and reassured a disconsolate Lett in the locker room.

Week 14 vs. Philadelphia Eagles 
Despite being sacked four times Troy Aikman completed seventeen passes for 178 yards and a first quarter score to Michael Irvin as the Cowboys led wire to wire and won 23–17.  Emmitt Smith had 172 yards on the ground.

Week 15 at Minnesota Vikings
In a penalty-plagued game (twenty combined fouls for 124 yards) the Cowboys led wire to wire again in winning 37–20.  Emmitt Smith added another 104 yards on the ground.

Week 16

Week 17 vs. Washington Redskins
The Redskins were obliterated 38–3 as Troy Aikman and Emmitt Smith accounted for 346 of Dallas’ 380 yards of offense.

Week 18 at New York Giants
Emmitt Smith put on a heroic effort overcoming a serious shoulder separation late in the second quarter to put up 229 yards of offense, 40 of them in overtime after the Giants tied the game.  Eddie Murray's game winning field goal earned the Cowboys the division title and a first-round playoff bye.   Following the game CBS broadcaster John Madden visited Smith in the locker room to shake his hand at his courage in finishing the game.

Standings

Playoffs

Schedule

NFC Divisional Playoff

NFC Championship Game

Super Bowl XXVIII

 Scoring summary
DAL – FG: Eddie Murray 41 yards 3–0 DAL
BUF – FG: Steve Christie 54 yards 3–3 tie
DAL – FG: Eddie Murray 24 yards 6–3 DAL
BUF – TD: Thurman Thomas 4 yard run (Steve Christie kick) 10–6 BUF
BUF – FG: Steve Christie 28 yards 13–6 BUF
DAL – TD: James Washington 46 yard fumble return (Eddie Murray kick) 13–13 tie
DAL – TD: Emmitt Smith 17 yard run (Eddie Murray kick) 20–13 DAL
DAL – TD: Emmitt Smith 1 yard run (Eddie Murray kick) 27–13 DAL
DAL – FG: Eddie Murray 20 yards 30–13 DAL

Staff

Roster

Awards and records
 Emmitt Smith, UPI NFC Player of the Year
 Emmitt Smith, Most Valuable Player, Super Bowl XXVIII
 Emmitt Smith, Bert Bell Award
 Emmitt Smith, Best NFL Player ESPY Award
 Emmitt Smith, Most Valuable Player, NFL
 Emmitt Smith, NFL rushing leader

Publications
 The Football Encyclopedia 
 Total Football 
 Cowboys Have Always Been My Heroes

References

External links
 1993 Dallas Cowboys
 Pro Football Hall of Fame
 Dallas Cowboys Official Site

NFC East championship seasons
Dallas
Dallas Cowboys seasons
National Football Conference championship seasons
Super Bowl champion seasons
Dallas